The Mississippi map turtle (Graptemys pseudogeographica kohni) is a subspecies of land and water turtle belonging to the family Emydidae. G. p. kohni is endemic to the central United States.

Etymology
The Mississippi map turtle derives its common name not from the state of Mississippi, but rather from the Mississippi River.

The specific name, kohni, is in honor of amateur naturalist Joseph Gustave Kohn (1837–1906) of New Orleans, Louisiana, who collected the type specimen.

Geographic range
Graptemys pseudogeographica kohni is found along the Mississippi River and its tributaries, from Illinois and Missouri southward.

Description
Their grey shells are covered in yellow lines resembling contour lines.

Captivity

The Mississippi map turtle is a popular pet for aquarists and is very enjoyable to watch.

References

Further reading
Conant R (1975). A Field Guide to Reptiles and Amphibians of Eastern and Central North America, Second Edition. Boston: Houghton Mifflin. xviii + 429 pp. + 48 plates.  (hardback),  (paperback). (Graptemys kohni, pp. 56–57 + Plates 5, 8 + Map 19).
Powell R, Conant R, Collins JT (2016). Peterson Field Guide to Reptiles and Amphibians of Eastern and Central North America, Fourth Edition. Boston and New York: Houghton Mifflin Harcourt. xiv + 494 pp., 47 Plates, 207 Figures. . (Graptemys pseudogeographica kohnii, pp. 208–209, Figure 93 + Plates 16, 21).
Smith HM; Brodie ED Jr (1982). Reptiles of North America: A Guide to Field Identification. New York: Golden Press. 240 pp.  (paperback). (Graptemys pseudogeographica kohni, pp. 50–51.)

Graptemys
Turtles of North America
Reptiles of the United States
Reptiles described in 1890
Taxa named by Georg Baur